Bulboaca may refer to:

Bulboaca, Anenii Noi, a commune in Anenii Noi district, Moldova
Bulboaca, Briceni, a commune in Briceni district, Moldova
Bulboaca, a village in Deleni, Vaslui, a commune in Vaslui County, Romania